André Elbaz (born April 26, 1934, El Jadida, Morocco) is a famous Moroccan painter and filmmaker.

Born to a Jewish family, Elbaz studied art and theatre in Rabat and Paris from 1950 to 1961. He started painting only at the age of 21, until which age he had been interested mainly in theatre. A few years later, he managed to combine his two passions into a new approach in art-therapy, inventing together with his wife, a psychiatrist, the Pictodrame, which brought him world recognition.

His first exhibition, which was very successful, took place in Casablanca in 1961 and earned him an appointment as Professor at the Beaux-Arts school in Casablanca. Years later, in 1976, he exhibited his paintings at the Tel-Aviv Museum.

In parallel to his career as a painter, Elbaz is also known as a filmmaker. He produced several short films in France, Canada and the United States. One of them, La nuit n'est jamais complète (The night is never complete), won a prize at the "5th Biennale de Paris in 1967" . Among the themes chosen for the many films he produced, there was a short one about the Warsaw Ghetto uprising, as well as a series of drawings entitled Seuls (Alone), with texts written by both Elie Wiesel and Naim Kattan. Both the short movie and the drawings were a result of his fascination by Holocaust related themes. This fascination also inspired him for other works that were shown at an exhibition at Yad Vashem in Jerusalem, in 1985. His paintings are famous for boasting traditional Jewish themes and he often present them in a chiefly expressionist style.

A retrospective of his lifetime achievements and works was held in 1990 at the Georges Pompidou Center in Paris.

Profile

Studies
 Graphic Arts and Theatre

One man show
 2006 - Retrospective of works from 1986-2005 in Morocco. Rabat/Casablanca (Institut Français),El Jadida (Salle Chaïbia),Fès (Musée Batha)
 2001 - Remember for the Future Maison Française, Oxford - Galerie La Croix Baragnon, Toulouse
 2000 - Cinq triptyques en guise de perspective - Mémorial du CDJC, Paris
 1999 - Le Défit à la Barbarie, Musée Départemental, Epinal- Bibliothèque de l'A.I.U. Parris
 1993 - Cegep Saint Laurent, Montréal
 1992 - Sala dei Congressi, Milano ; Casa della Cultura, Livorno - Carlton Center, Ottawa ; Jewish Public Library, Montréal
 1990 - Biennale du Film d'Art, Centre Pompidou,  Paris
 1990 - Seïbu Gallery, Tokyo
 1989 - Nishi-Azabu ; Azakloth Gallery, Tokyo
 1985 - Musée d'Art, Yad Vashem, Jérusalem
 1984 - Galerie Aut der Land, Munich
 1976 - Musée de Tel Aviv
      - La Rotonde, Aix-en-Provence ; Centre Edmond Fleg, Marseille
      - Château de Herbeys, Grenoble
 1975 - Centre Rachi, Paris
 1972 - Albert White Gallery, Toronto
 1970 - Terre des Hommes, Montréal
 1969 - Waddington Gallery, Montréal
 1965 - Centre Culturel Français, Casablanca
 1964 - Zwemmer Gallery, Londres
 1962-63-1965 - Musée de Bab Rouah, Rabat
 1960 - Balliol College, Oxford

Awards
 1998 - Prix Mémoire de la Shoah - Fondation du Judaïsme Français
 1968 - La Nuit n'est jamais complète Lauréat du court métrage - Vème Biennale de Paris.

Salons
 1973 - Jean Paulhan à travers ses peintres
 1968 - Nuit Culturelle de Nancy avec Roêl d'Haese, Pierre Schaeffer, René de Obaldia Esposito, Piem.
 1961-1963-1965-1967 - Biennales de Paris, Musée d'Art Moderne
 1955-1959 - Salon des Surindépendants - Salon de l'Ecole Française - Salon d'Hiver
 Salon de la jeune Peinture - Musée d'Art Moderne - Paris

Short films and animations
 1972 - Histoire d'œufs, animation at Montreal
 1971 - Regard sur la Peinture Américaine, Whitney Museum, New York
 1970 - L'homme à la Bouteille, Created at the NFB in Montreal at the request of Norman McLaren - Les Mobiles chez Calder at MOMA New York
 1969 - Graphiques for " Kaddish " by Léonard Bernstein
 1966 - La Nuit n'est Jamais Complète, Oratorio "A Survivor from Warsaw " Arnold Schöenberg, Service de la Recherche de l'ORTF - represents France at the Festival du Court-Métrage in Tours

Films
 1971 - Seuls, Portfolio of 20 sérigraphies, Texts from Elie Wiesel & Naïm Kattan.
 1991 - De feu et d'exil, Portefolio of 20 serigraphies on the theme of the l'Inquisition, texts from François-Marc Gagnon, Shmuel Trigano & Naïm Kattan

References

External links
official site Andre Elbaz, the artist: Comprehensive summary of his life and his work

20th-century Moroccan Jews
Moroccan film directors
Jewish painters
1934 births
Living people
People from El Jadida
Moroccan contemporary artists
20th-century Moroccan painters
21st-century Moroccan painters
Moroccan male painters